Renato Portaluppi (born 9 September 1962), known as Renato Gaúcho, is a Brazilian professional football coach and former player who is currently in charge of Grêmio.

Formerly a right winger, Renato is known for his wins at the Intercontinental Cup in 1983 as a player for Grêmio, his two Copa Libertadores one as Grêmio player in 1983 and one in 2017 as Grêmio coach, his 1989 Copa América as player for Brazil, and mainly being known for "Rei Do Rio" (King of Rio de Janeiro). When in the heat of Brazilian national soccer, he won the Campeonato Carioca of 1995 and won the prize given by the press for being the MVP in the championship and giving the title to Fluminense when beating some of the best Brazilian players of all time, Romário (Flamengo), Túlio Maravilha (Botafogo), Valdir Bigode (Vasco).

Playing career

Club 
Born in Guaporé, Rio Grande do Sul, Renato started his career in Esportivo in Bento Gonçalves where he grew up. He was later signed with Grêmio, where in 1983 he won the Copa Libertadores, beating Peñarol of Uruguay, and the Intercontinental Cup, beating Hamburger SV of Germany, and scoring twice, this way consolidating Grêmio as one of the giants of Brazilian soccer, when they win his first and only world title.

In 1987, he moved to Flamengo and won the Brasileirão Série A in the same year. Then in 1988, Renato moved abroad, signing with Roma. However, he failed to settle in Italy and returned to Flamengo after only one disappointing season, in time to win one more trophy, the Copa do Brasil in 1990.

Renato's career in Fluminense is generally associated with his belly goal in the Campeonato Carioca of 1995, against Flamengo, in the year when Flamengo celebrated 100 years. With his goal, he was crowned the King of Rio in that year. In the same year, he led Fluminense to the semi-finals of the Brasileirão Série A.

Before his retirement in Bangu, he played again for Flamengo where he played 210 games, scoring 64 goals in his four passage at the club.

International 
Renato appeared 41 times for the Brazil national team, scoring five goals.

In 1986, while preparing for the FIFA World Cup Finals in Mexico, Renato was dropped from the squad by coach Telê Santana for disciplinary reasons, when he and his friend who also played at Brazil national team Leandro got in the hotel after the scheduled time. Renato was remembered for being a loyal friend when it happened because he could jump through the hotel wall and get in unnoticed. But when his friend couldn't, he walked through the main door with him. Leandro was an important and irreplaceable player, so he still got called for the finals and Renato didn't. But to return the loyalty to Renato, Leandro said he wouldn't play if Renato wasn't reaccepted. Renato wasn't recalled and then Leandro made his word true and quit the selection. Leandro's replacement at right-back was Edson, who was injured in the second World Cup match and was then replaced by the relatively unknown Josimar of Botafogo, who became one of the stars of the tournament.

Managerial career

Early years 
In 1996, while recovering from a knee injury, Renato was an interim manager of Fluminense on two occasions. As the club struggled to remain outside the relegation zone, Renato "promised to walk naked in the Ipanema beach" if the club suffered relegation, which did occur after they finished in the penultimate place; however, a match-fixing scandal cancelled the relegations shortly after, which kept Fluminense in the first division.

Renato's full managerial experience occurred in 2001, as he took over Madureira. Between 2 September 2002 and 11 July 2003, and between 1 October 2003 and 28 December 2003, he was coach of Fluminense. From July 2005 to April 2007, he was Vasco da Gama's coach.

Fluminense 
In April 2007, he returned to Fluminense as a manager. On 6 June 2007, he won the Brazilian Cup with Fluminense, his first trophy as a manager. However, he failed to win the Copa Libertadores as Fluminense were defeated in a penalty shootout to underdogs LDU from Ecuador in the final.

On 10 August 2008, Renato was sacked as manager of Fluminense Football Club. His sacking followed a 2–1 defeat to the Brasileirão's bottom side, Ipatinga which left them joint-bottom of the table. On 18 September 2008, he was hired as Vasco's manager. 
Fluminense reappointed Renato Gaúcho on 21 July 2009 to replace Carlos Alberto Parreira, who was sacked in July 2009. Renato returned for a third stint, having already coached Fluminense twice before (in 2002–2003 and again in 2007–2008). On 1 September 2009, Fluminense dismissed him following a series of poor results.

Being the first choice of the sponsor, who intervened with the presidency, Renato was chosen again as coach of Fluminense, for a fifth spell at the club from Laranjeiras.

Bahia 
On 13 December 2009, Renato was named manager of Bahia for the 2010 season, in the place of Paulo Bonamigo.

Grêmio 
On 10 August 2010, Grêmio confirmed Renato was their new coach, two days after the sacking of their former coach Silas. He tried to start a good season, but in his debut the team lost to Goiás and was eliminated from the 2010 Copa Sudamericana on the Second Stage. In the 2010 Brazilian League Grêmio ended in 4th place and consequently qualified to 2011 Copa Libertadores. Afterward, Renato did not do a great season in 2011. His team lost the 2011 Campeonato Gaúcho finals to their rival Internacional and was the runner-up. Grêmio was also eliminated from the 2011 Copa Libertadores on the Round of 16, losing to Chilean club Universidad Católica. All of that disappointed himself and Grêmio's President Paulo Odone. He coached some matches of the 2011 Brazilian League, however their performance wasn't good, and Renato resigned on June 30.

Even after being two years without coaching any club, Renato was the first choice of Fábio Koff, president of Grêmio, to succeed Vanderlei Luxemburgo as the new coach of Grêmio. On 2 July 2013, the coach signed with the club and was presented to more than 5,000 supporters in Grêmio Arena.

In 2016, Grêmio was going through some hard time, they fired their coach Roger Machado. Many people thought Grêmio would be eliminated on Copa do Brasil in the round of 16 by Atlético Paranaense. Grêmio didn't have great names in his team and haven't won a big title in 15 years – the last one being the 2001 Copa do brasil. Renato lead Grêmio to the classification in penalties which gave hope to Grêmio fans. Then, he kept the good soccer defeating the biggest teams of Brazilian soccer, Palmeiras (8th), Cruzeiro (4th) and in the finals against Atlético Mineiro in a BO2 final type, winning the first game in Belo Horizonte by 3-1 in an excellent match. Then, consolidating the results in Porto Alegre at Arena do Grêmio by drawing 1-1 and in final score with an 4-2 Grêmio won the Copa do Brasil. Curiously, in the same year, its biggest rival Sport Club Internacional had a bad campaign in the Brasileirão and was demoted to the Série B for the first time in its history. Copa do Brasil is known for its huge prize, with Grêmio winning R$68,7 l, which really helped its economy. The title gave Grêmio the spot to 2017 Copa Libertadores, this way starting Renato's third time as Grêmio's coach.

In the following year, Grêmio had a great campaign in Libertadores Group Stage, and classification as the first of its group, Grêmio played against Godoy Cruz (16th), Botafogo (8th), Barcelona de Guayaquil (4th). In the last year that the final was played in the two teams' stadium (2018 the last game of final was played in Spain and in 2019 the rule was changed and the finals now are played in just one game, as Champions League is), Grêmio won in an emotional 1-0 in Arena do Grêmio and in the 2nd game against Lanús at Estádio La fortaleza Grêmio won by 2-1 and became a Libertadores Champion for the 3rd time.

In the 2018 season, he helped his team to win the Recopa Sudamericana over Independiente and the Campeonato Gaúcho over Brasil de Pelotas, their first win since 2010.

Renato helped Grêmio to win the Campeonato Gaúcho in the 2019 and 2020 campaigns, while also having a statue of him inaugurated near the Arena do Grêmio in March 2019. On 15 April 2021, after being knocked out in the first stages of the 2021 Copa Libertadores, he was sacked by the club after more than four years in charge; he was the longest-serving manager in all the four divisions of Brazilian football.

Flamengo 
Following his sacking by Grêmio, Renato was hired by Flamengo on 10 July 2021, having previously played for them as a player across four separate stints.  He signed a contract until the end of the season.

Renato won his first six matches in charge of the club, averaging four goals per match. On 29 September, he helped his side to reach the 2021 Copa Libertadores Final, after defeating Barcelona SC 4–0 on aggregate.

Flamengo's good form did not last long under Renato's guidance, and after the club lost the Libertadores Final to Palmeiras, he left on a mutual agreement on 29 November 2021.

Grêmio 
On 1 September 2022, Renato returned to Grêmio, replacing sacked Roger Machado.

Career statistics

Club

International

International goals
Scores and results list Brazil's goal tally first.

Managerial statistics

Honours

Player
Grêmio
 Intercontinental Cup: 1983
 Copa Libertadores: 1983
 Campeonato Gaúcho: 1985, 1986

Flamengo
 Campeonato Brasileiro Série A: 1987
 Copa do Brasil: 1990
 Supercopa Sudamericana (runner-up): 1993

Cruzeiro
 Supercopa Libertadores: 1992
 Campeonato Mineiro: 1992

Fluminense
 Campeonato Carioca: 1995
Brazil
Copa América: 1989
Individual
Intercontinental Cup – Man of the Match: 1983
Bola de Ouro: 1987
Bola de Prata: 1984, 1987, 1990, 1992, 1995
South American Team of the Year: 1992

Manager
Fluminense
 Copa do Brasil: 2007

Grêmio
 Copa do Brasil: 2016
 Copa Libertadores: 2017
 Campeonato Gaúcho: 2018, 2019, 2020
 Recopa Sudamericana: 2018
Individual
Copa Libertadores Best Manager: 2017
Campeonato Gaúcho Best Manager: 2018, 2019

References

External links

1962 births
Living people
Sportspeople from Rio Grande do Sul
Brazilian footballers
Brazilian football managers
Association football forwards
Campeonato Brasileiro Série A players
Serie A players
1990 FIFA World Cup players
1983 Copa América players
1989 Copa América players
1991 Copa América players
Brazilian people of Italian descent
Brazil international footballers
Brazilian expatriate footballers
Expatriate footballers in Italy
Copa América-winning players
Copa Libertadores-winning players
Campeonato Brasileiro Série A managers
Campeonato Brasileiro Série B managers
Grêmio Foot-Ball Porto Alegrense players
CR Flamengo footballers
A.S. Roma players
Botafogo de Futebol e Regatas players
Cruzeiro Esporte Clube players
Clube Atlético Mineiro players
Fluminense FC players
Bangu Atlético Clube players
Madureira Esporte Clube managers
Fluminense FC managers
CR Vasco da Gama managers
Esporte Clube Bahia managers
Grêmio Foot-Ball Porto Alegrense managers
Club Athletico Paranaense managers